Constant Fornerod (30 May 1819 – 27 November 1899) was a Swiss politician, originally from Avenches, and member of the Swiss Federal Council (1855-1867).

He was elected to the Federal Council on 11 July 1855 as a representative for Vaud. He handed over office on 31 October 1867. He was affiliated with the Free Democratic Party. 

During his time in office he held the following departments:
 Department of Trade and Customs (1855 - 1856)
 Political Department as President of the Confederation (1857) 
 Department of Trade and Customs (1858)
 Department of Finance (1859 - 1861)
 Military Department (1862)
 Political Department as President of the Confederation (1863)
 Military Department (1864 - 1866)
 Political Department as President of the Confederation (1867).

References

External links 

 
 

1819 births
1899 deaths
People from Gros-de-Vaud District
Swiss Calvinist and Reformed Christians
Free Democratic Party of Switzerland politicians
Foreign ministers of Switzerland
Finance ministers of Switzerland
Members of the Federal Council (Switzerland)
Members of the Council of States (Switzerland)
Presidents of the Council of States (Switzerland)
University of Lausanne alumni